By Right of Possession is a 1917 American silent Western film directed by William Wolbert and starring Mary Anderson, Antonio Moreno and Otto Lederer.

Cast
 Mary Anderson as Kate Saxon
 Antonio Moreno as Tom Baxter
 Otto Lederer as Bells
 Leon De La Mothe as Trimble

References

Bibliography
 Langman, Larry. American Film Cycles: The Silent Era. Greenwood Publishing, 1998.

External links
 

1917 films
1917 Western (genre) films
American black-and-white films
Films directed by William Wolbert
Silent American Western (genre) films
Vitagraph Studios films
1910s English-language films
1910s American films